Phrynobatrachus asper is a species of frog in the family Phrynobatrachidae. It is endemic to the Itombwe Mountains in the eastern Democratic Republic of the Congo.

References

asper
Endemic fauna of the Democratic Republic of the Congo
Amphibians of the Democratic Republic of the Congo
Taxa named by Raymond Laurent
Amphibians described in 1951
Taxonomy articles created by Polbot